The Madison Stakes is a Grade I American Thoroughbred horse race for fillies and mares that are four years old or older, over a distance of seven furlongs on the dirt held annually in early April at Keeneland Race Course, Lexington, Kentucky during the spring meeting.  The event currently carries a purse of $500,000.

History

The race is named for Madison County, the largest county in the Bluegrass region of Kentucky.

The event was inaugurated on 10 April 2002 and was won by the favorite Victory Ride by one length in a time of 1:23.

In 2005 the event was upgraded from a Listed race to Grade III status, then in 2006 to Grade II. In 2009 it became a Grade I event.

From 2006 to 2014, it was contested on a Polytrack artificial dirt surface. After the spring meet of 2014, the Polytrack was replaced by a new dirt surface.

Between 2004 and 2012 the name of the event carried its sponsor, Vinery, a local Thoroughbred breeding operation near the Lexington area.

Records
Speed record
 1.21:32 – Dr. Zic (2010)

Margins
  lengths – Dubai Escapade (2006)

Most wins by a jockey
 3 – Edgar Prado (2002, 2006, 2007)

Most wins by an owner
 2 – Juddmonte Farms (2008, 2017)

Most wins by a trainer
 2 – Chad C. Brown (2017, 2020)
 2 – Wesley A. Ward (2014, 2021)

Winners

Legend:

See also 
 List of American and Canadian Graded races

External links 
 2021 Keeneland Media Guide

References

Graded stakes races in the United States
Grade 1 stakes races in the United States
Flat horse races for four-year-old fillies
Recurring sporting events established in 2002
Keeneland horse races
2002 establishments in Kentucky